GWW may refer to:
 Great White Wonder, a Bob Dylan bootleg album
 Kwini language
 RAF Gatow, a former airfield in Berlin
 W. W. Grainger, an American industrial supply company
 Wayne Executive Jetport, in North Carolina, United States
 G-Worldwide Entertainment, a Nigerian entertainment company